Gonera is a surname. Notable people with the surname include:

 Andrzej Gonera (born 1939), Polish gymnast
 Robert Gonera (born 1969), Polish actor

See also
 Bonera

Polish-language surnames